Asa Keisar (born September 1, 1973) is an Israeli Jewish religious scholar, rabbi, scribe, and advocate for veganism. He has given many public lectures across Israel in support of veganism as both a Torah imperative to avoid cruelty to animals, as well as it being the Torah's ideal for mankind.

Early life and education
Keisar was born and raised in a National Religious home in Kiryat Ono, Israel.  He is of Yemenite Jewish ancestry. He was raised vegetarian and later became a vegan. He served in the Israeli army, and later studied at a Haredi yeshiva in Israel.

Vegan advocacy
Keisar became a vegan after learning about the widespread animal welfare issues present in today's egg and dairy factory farms. In 2015, he wrote the book Velifnei Iver (translated as Before the Blind, in reference to the commandment in the Book of Leviticus, "Do not put a stumbling block before the blind"). In the book he makes the case that eating meat and animal byproducts is no longer permitted according to Jewish sources, because of the cruelty inflicted on animals by the modern mass production of meat, dairy and eggs.

Based on Biblical, Talmudic and halachic (Jewish law) sources, Keisar's stance is that veganism is a Torah ideal, and Jews should therefore follow a vegan diet. He argues that although eating meat is permitted, not everything permitted in the Torah should necessarily be done, and the Torah permits eating meat only as a concession, in the same way the Torah permits such antiquated deeds as owning slaves or having relations with a woman outside of marriage during a time of war. Keisar encourages Israelis to consume a plant-based diet due to the animal welfare issues surrounding slaughterhouses, chicken coops, egg farms and dairy farms. He states that contemporary factory farm animal abuses violate Jewish law. He uses classical Jewish sources to show that the Torah's prohibitions of cruelty to animals apply to today's factory farms, and that consumption of these animals or their products are in violation of Jewish law.

In addition to interviews in mainstream Israeli media, his book Velifnei Iver was distributed in 2016 to yeshivas throughout Israel. Keisar also presents a ten-minute lecture on the subject, Religious Veganism, discussing what the Torah, Talmud and scholars have to say about meat consumption. He has given the lecture at universities, high schools and yeshivas across Israel. A video of the lecture posted on YouTube in 2018, as well as a two-minute version of it, have each been viewed over two million times as of September 2018. On November 15, 2017, the President of Israel, Reuven Rivlin, wrote a letter to Keisar in appreciation of his work regarding veganism and animal suffering as a moral and Jewish imperative.

His second book, Velifnei Iver Hashalem, was published in 2018 and was distributed too to yeshivas. It includes 100 pages with extensions and fixes to the first book, which had 53 pages. The new book was printed in tens of thousands of copies and distributed for free. The book has got approbations from Rabbi Moshe Zuriel, Rabbi Daniel Sperber, Rabbi David Rosen and Rabbi Nathan Lopes Cardozo.

Asa Keisar's book has been translated into English as a result of long and meticulous work. The book "Velifnei Iver Hashalem" ("Before the Blind") discusses where Judaism really stands on the subject of slaughtering animals and eating their flesh. The book was translated by Rabbi Don Gross and 1000 copies of it were printed in a very elegant edition. The book is 240 pages long and it is designed with spectacular graphics which provides the reader with an unusual experience. The book starts with agreements from important rabbis and it provides the reader with the wisdom and knowledge that G-d does not wish for animals blood to get spilled, and it teaches us how the creator wants us to treat the animals he created next to us.

In 2020, Kaiser established the kosher symbol Vegan Kosher, which offers companies a vegan kosher certificate, ensuring products are both free from animal exploitation and produced according to Jewish law. Vegan Kosher is an internationally accredited standard and certificate administered by Orthodox Jewish rabbis from Israel. The Vegan Kosher logo helps kosher or vegan consumers to purchase products and be one hundred percent sure that the product is indeed vegan and kosher.  The logo was established to prevent reliability concerns, reading complex labels, interpreting unfamiliar components or contacting the manufacturer. The Vegan Kosher Committee adheres to veganism at the strictest level as well as kosher standards.

Documentary
Keisar is featured in an upcoming documentary, Holy Vegans, which began filming in 2016 and is about vegans and vegan culture in Israel.

Personal life
Keisar lives in Petah Tikva, Israel. He has four children.

Bibliography

Books
 Velifnei Iver (2015)

Lectures
 Religious Veganism (2018)

References

External links
 Official website
 Vegan Kosher: New label on offer uniting two major food trends
 Vegan Kosher Certification
 About Vegan Kosher
 Get Certified

Living people
1973 births
Animal welfare and rights in Israel
Jewish activists
Israeli activists
Israeli veganism activists
Israeli political activists
People from Kiryat Ono
People from Petah Tikva
Israeli Orthodox rabbis
Jewish vegetarianism